Artur Siryk (born 17 February 1989) is a professional Ukrainian football striker who plays for FC Poltava in the Ukrainian First League.

External links 
 Official FC Kharkiv Website Profile (Ukr)
 Official FFU Website Profile (Ukr)

1989 births
Sportspeople from Potsdam
Living people
Ukrainian footballers
FC Kharkiv players
FC Prykarpattia Ivano-Frankivsk (2004) players
FC Poltava players
FC Mariupol players
Association football forwards
Footballers from Brandenburg